There are six places called Azizabad in Delfan County:

 Azizabad, Delfan 
 Azizabad, Kakavand 
 Azizabad, alternate name of Aziz Koshteh
 Azizabad, alternate name of Mohammad Shahabad
 Azizabad-e Pain